Settled Down may refer to:
"Settled Down", a song from The King of Whys (2016)
"Settled Down", a 2015 song by Hyukoh